Edna Milton Holland (September 20, 1895 – May 4, 1982) was an American actress. Her stage, screen and television lasted from the beginning of the 20th century to 1965.

Holland was the daughter of comedian Edmund Milton Holland and actress Emity Seward. Her uncle, Joseph Holland, was an actor.

As a child, she played in stage productions by David Belasco. Beginning in 1915, Holland appeared in silent films, including Always in the Way, The Feud Girl, Mary Moreland and The Masked Rider. She met her husband on the set of the Masked Rider, a fellow actor named Robert Taber (real name Stuart Fordham Tabor) who was origially from Sag Harbor, Long Island, New York. They married on May 15, 1919.

She was often seen as "The Other Woman" to actresses such as Mary Miles Minter. After an absence of nearly 20 years and numerous stage roles, Holland resumed making films in the late 1930s. Middle-aged, she often portrayed "professional women such as teachers, nurses or secretaries" in supporting roles or minor parts. She played her last role on television in The Andy Griffith Show in 1966.

Holland died from a ruptured aneurysm in 1982, aged 86.

Selected filmography

Always in the Way (1915) - Mrs. Helen Stillwell
One Day (1916)
The Feud Girl (1916)
Mary Moreland (1917) - Cicely Torrance
The Masked Rider (1919) - Juanita - Pancho's Daughter
Lightning Bryce (1919, Serial) - Daisy Bliss - Ep. 1, 2 & 3 (uncredited)
The Harvest Moon (1920) - Madame Mercier
Sheltered Daughters (1921) - Sonia
Bachelor Mother (1939) - Orphanage Matron
Kid Nightingale (1939) - Madame Svenson - Gym Instructress (uncredited)
Judge Hardy and Son (1939) - Nurse Trowbridge
Forty Little Mothers (1940) - Miss Higgins (uncredited)
My Favorite Wife (1940) - Johnny Weissmuller Inquirer (uncredited)
Third Finger, Left Hand (1940) - Miss Lawton (uncredited)
Sunny (1941) - Venus (uncredited)
Tom, Dick and Harry (1941) - Miss Schlom, Janie's Boss (uncredited)
Ringside Maisie (1941) - Third Nurse (uncredited)
They Died with Their Boots On (1941) - Nurse (uncredited)
Look Who's Laughing (1941) - Mrs. Hargrave (uncredited)
Born to Sing (1942) - Welfare Worker (uncredited)
Fingers at the Window (1942) - Clinic Nurse (uncredited)
Calling Dr. Gillespie (1942) - Nurse Trayhan on Sixth Floor (uncredited)
Laugh Your Blues Away (1942) - Mrs. Watson
Dr. Gillespie's Criminal Case (1943) - Nurse Morgan (uncredited)
Allergic to Love (1944) - Miss Peabody
The Mark of the Whistler (1944) - Childrens Aid Society Woman (uncredited)
Between Two Women (1945) - Nurse Morgan
Kiss and Tell (1945) - Mrs. Mary Franklin
Sunbonnet Sue (1945) - Julia
Swing Parade of 1946 (1946) - Landlady (uncredited)
Dark Alibi (1946) - Mrs. Foss
Cluny Brown (1946) - Onlooker Outside Bookstore (uncredited)
Centennial Summer (1946) - Nurse (uncredited)
Living in a Big Way (1947) - Committee Woman (uncredited)
Curley (1947) - Miss Payne
The Hal Roach Comedy Carnival (1947) - Miss Payne, in 'Curly'
Song of Love (1947) - Mrs. Fohling (uncredited)
Intrigue (1947) - Miss Carr (uncredited)
Louisiana (1947)
Gentleman's Agreement (1947) - (uncredited)
The Prairie (1948) - Esther Bush
B.F.'s Daughter (1948) - Maurine, B.F.'s Secretary (uncredited)
The Hunted (1948) - Miss Turner
Ruthless (1948) - Libby Sims
Letter from an Unknown Woman (1948) - Nun (uncredited)
The Snake Pit (1948) - Elderly Nurse (uncredited)
Shep Comes Home (1949) - Mrs. Fleming
Criss Cross (1949) - Mrs. Thompson
Henry, the Rainmaker (1949) - Mrs. Parker
Son of a Bad Man (1949) - Mrs. Burley
Sky Dragon (1949) - Demanding Old Woman Passenger (uncredited)
The Lovable Cheat (1949) - Madame Pierquin
Once More, My Darling (1949) - Mrs. Grant
My Foolish Heart (1949) - Dean Whiting
Key to the City (1950) - Mrs. Gertrude Allen (uncredited)
No Man of Her Own (1950) - Nurse (uncredited)
Never a Dull Moment (1950) - Neighbor at Shivaree (uncredited)
Lonely Heart Bandits (1950) - Minor Role (uncredited)
Three Secrets (1950) - Receptionist (uncredited)
Strangers on a Train (1951) - Mrs. Joyce (uncredited)
Love Nest (1951) - Mrs. Engstrand (uncredited)
Scandal Sheet (1952) - NY Express Board Member (uncredited)
Chained for Life (1952) - Mabel
Paula (1952) - Old Nurse (uncredited)
Has Anybody Seen My Gal? (1952) - Seamstress (uncredited)
Meet Me at the Fair (1953) - Miss Burghey
Treasure of the Golden Condor (1953) - Fontaine's Wife (uncredited)
Roar of the Crowd (1953) - Mrs. Atkinson
Ten Wanted Men (1955) - Ann (uncredited)
Women's Prison (1955) - Sarah Graham
The Night of the Hunter (1955) - Woman Feeding Hungry Children (uncredited)
To Hell and Back (1955) - Mrs. Edna Houston (uncredited)
My Sister Eileen (1955) - Matron (uncredited)
The Girl in the Red Velvet Swing (1955) - Saleswoman (uncredited)
The Court-Martial of Billy Mitchell (1955) - Mrs. Sturges (uncredited)
The Kettles in the Ozarks (1956) - Minor Role (uncredited)
Over-Exposed (1956) - Mrs. Gulick
These Wilder Years (1956) - Nurse (uncredited)
The Bad Seed (1956) - Saleslady (uncredited)
Top Secret Affair (1957) - Myrna Maynard (uncredited)
This Could Be the Night (1957) - Elderly Teacher (uncredited)
Blood of Dracula (1957) - Miss Rivers
Home Before Dark (1958) - Miss Angie (uncredited)
The Last Angry Man (1959) - Gattling's Secretary (uncredited)
Inside Daisy Clover (1965) - Cynara

References

External links
 

1895 births
1982 deaths
20th-century American actresses
American film actresses